The Roman Spring of Mrs. Stone is a 2003 made-for-television romantic drama film and a remake of the 1961 film of the same name based on the 1950 novel of the same title by Tennessee Williams.

Plot
The film follows the odyssey of Karen Stone, an actress who loses her husband to a heart attack. In Rome, she meets a contessa and another man with other romantic intentions and interests that have nothing to do with Mrs. Stone.

Production
The screenplay was written by Martin Sherman, based on the Tennessee Williams novel. Variety noted that he "distills the essence of the story — a repressed woman’s sexual awakening — into a provocative piece that relies as much on visuals as it does narrative." The film was directed by Robert Allan Ackerman and produced by James Flynn and Morgan O'Sullivan. It was shot on location in Dublin and Rome. It is Bancroft's final film appearance.

Cast
Sources:

 Helen Mirren — Karen Stone
 Olivier Martinez — Paolo di Lio
 Anne Bancroft — Contessa
 Brian Dennehy — Tom Stone
 Rodrigo Santoro — Young Man

Nominations and awards

Emmy Awards
The film received five 2003 Emmy Awards nominations, including
 Lead Actress: Helen Mirren
 Supporting Actress: Anne Bancroft
 Outstanding Music: John Altman
 Outstanding Directing: Robert Allan Ackerman
 Outstanding Costumes: Dona Granata (costume designer) and Gill Howard (assistant costume designer)

Golden Globe Awards
Nomination for Best Mini-Series or Motion Picture Made for Television
Best Performance by an Actress in a Mini-Series or a Motion Picture Made for Television - Helen Mirren.

Releases
It first aired in the United States on Showtime on May 4, 2003 and released on DVD by Showtime Entertainment in 2004.

See also
 Male prostitution
 Gigolo
 Male prostitution in the arts
 Female sex tourism
 American Gigolo

References

External links
 
 
 

2003 television films
2003 films
2003 romantic drama films
Remakes of American films
American romantic drama films
Irish television films
Television remakes of films
Films based on American novels
Films based on works by Tennessee Williams
Showtime (TV network) films
Films directed by Robert Allan Ackerman
2000s English-language films
2000s American films